WHRO-TV, virtual channel 15 (UHF digital channel 31), is a Public Broadcasting Service (PBS) member television station licensed to both Hampton and Norfolk, Virginia, United States. Owned by the Hampton Roads Educational Telecommunications Association (HRETA), a consortium of 20 Hampton Roads and Eastern Shore school systems, it is sister to public radio stations WHRV (89.5 FM) and WHRO-FM (90.3). The stations share studios at the Public Telecommunications Center for Hampton Roads next to the campus of Old Dominion University in Norfolk, while WHRO-TV's transmitter is located in Suffolk, Virginia.

History

The station signed on October 2, 1961 as the first educational station licensed in Virginia. The channel 15 position was previously occupied by then-NBC and now current ABC affiliate WVEC-TV, now on channel 13. It was a member of National Educational Television (NET) and owned by the Norfolk and Hampton school systems. Only two years later, it moved to its current facility in Norfolk, which was heavily renovated in 1990. Eight other school systems began using WHRO's services in 1964 and HRETA was formed two years later. It became a charter member of PBS in 1970.

WHRO is well known for its instructional programming, much of which is distributed to other PBS stations as well as member/owner and other school systems and health systems through a private educational broadcast network.

WHRO also had an annual fundraising auction marathon, The Great TV Auction, which featured local celebrities as auctioneers.

WHRO also sponsors the Consortium for Interactive Instruction (CII), which is a partnership among all the Hampton Roads area school divisions as well as many private schools for the advancement of technology in the school curriculum. One of the key events that CII sponsors is the Great Computer Challenge. This is a competition for students at all levels of K-12 education in many areas of computer technology. For example, students at the middle and high school levels compete in categories varying from web design to C++, Visual Basic and Java programming, as well as music composition, computer-aided design, desktop publishing and desktop presentations (PowerPoint).

To celebrate its 50th anniversary, WHRO changed its logo on September 27, 2009.

Eastern Shore translators
There are two low-powered translators of WHRO-TV that are located in the Eastern Shore of Virginia and are municipally owned by Accomack County rather than the HRETA. WHRO-TV and the HRETA do not own or operate any translators in the Greater Hampton Roads area.
 W18EG-D  Channel 18.4  Onancock
 W25AA-D  Channel 25  Onancock

WHRO-TV previously had a translator with the call sign W20CW serving Craddockville; the license for this translator was canceled on March 28, 2011.

Digital television

Digital channels
The station's digital signal is multiplexed:

Analog-to-digital conversion
WHRO-TV discontinued regular programming on its analog signal, over UHF channel 15, on February 17, 2009, to conclude the federally mandated from analog to digital television. The station's digital signal remained on its pre-transition UHF channel 16, using PSIP to display WHRO-TV's virtual channel as 15 on digital television receivers.

References

External links

Hampton, Virginia
Norfolk, Virginia
PBS member stations
Television channels and stations established in 1959
HRO-TV
1959 establishments in Virginia